The Free City of Danzig Police (German: Polizei der Freien Stadt Danzig) or Schutzpolizei, as it was known locally, was a state constabulary and the official law enforcement agency within the Free City of Danzig, primarily from 1921 to 1939.

Organization

General Police 
The League of Nations allowed for the Free City of Danzig to maintain a regular police force of several hundred men, which was bolstered by a poorly trained and ill-equipped citizens' militia with approximately 3,000 members. The constabulary reported to the Danzig Senate's Department of Internal Affairs. The police principally operated from 12 precincts, called Revier,  and 7 registration points. Initially, they were organized as follows:

In 1926 the constabulary was reformed and the number of reviers was reduced to 9. They were as follows:

Other Branches

Railway Police 
The Polish Railway Administration employed members of the police to provide security for their railways. Paid for by the Polish government, the railway police were subject to both Danzig's general policing laws and the by–laws and direction of the railway administration.

Harbour Police 
A coast guard/harbour police section, called Küstenschutz der Danziger Polizei, was also maintained. It initially was a force of 120 individuals, which were managed by Danzig's Harbour Board. One section was to provide aid in navigation, while the other maintained safety and security. Arguments over the administration and authority of this branch led to much tension between the Free City's Senate and the Polish government. The Danzig Senate asserted it had the responsibility of upholding the law and could not surrender its executive powers to an external force. Poland argued its economic rights in the city could not be guaranteed if Danzig had the power to arbitrarily interfere with Polish shipping. In 1933 the Senate resolved to place the harbour under the direct protection of the regular police. Poland protested to the city's High Commissioner, but ultimately the League of Nations dismissed their complaint. In June 1934 Poland and Nazi Germany reached an agreement by which the Harbour Board would directly employ 12 Poles and 12 Danzigers to protect the port, under charge of the chief pilot. The Senate granted them the status of auxiliary police.

Air police 

A police air squadron was established in November 1919 in Langfuhr with 25 members, including four pilots and two gunners. The squadron would ultimately field 20 different types of aircraft, including the Albatros C.XII and the Fokker D.VII. The squadron spent most of its time doing exercises and couriering. In May 1920 the implementation of the Treaty of Versailles outlawed the force. On 21 November the aircraft were requisitioned by Poland and the squadron was dissolved.

The squadron was replaced with the Fliegerzeug der Verkehrshundertschaft der Schutzpolizei der Freien Stadt Danzig, also known as the Luftaufsicht. Most of the staff were carried over from the previous unit. In mid-1922, the force was renamed Luftfahrtüberwachungsstelle (L.Ü.St.). It was usually under the command of a police captain. In addition to the station in Langfuhr, the water airport in Plehnendorf (Rudniki) was used for auxiliary purposes.

History

Establishment and early years 
After the end of World War I Danzig was left without the administration of the German authorities. On 19 August 1919, the Sicherheitspolizei, or security police (called Sipo for short) was formed to protect the city's citizens and maintain order. Officers wore traditional dark blue uniforms with black shako caps.

On 9 April 1920, a military style marching band, the Musikkorps, was created. It was led by Obermusikmeister , a well-respected composer, and became prominent throughout the city and Europe.

In 1921, Danzig's government reformed the entire institution and established the Schutzpolizei, or protection police (Schupo for short). On 1 April, Helmut Froböss was chosen to be the President of the Police (German: Der Polizei-Präsident). He would serve in this post until late 1939.

In 1922 the police began introducing new gray-green caps and uniforms. The caps were now adorned with a coat of arms inscribed with the city's motto, "Nec Temere, Nec Timide". By 1 December 1924, they had completely replaced the traditional attire.

Nazism, political repression, and conflict with Poland 

After the Nazi takeover of the Senate in 1933, the police were increasingly used to suppress free speech and political dissent. The constabulary itself was also directly affected. On 31 October 1933, in a speech made to the Police Administration Professional Union, according to the newspaper Danziger Neueste Nachrichten,  the vice-president of the Danzig Senate said,

This was in conjunction with a subsequent dissolution and ban on professional unions within the state constabulary. The speech and the ban were the subject of much criticism in the 2 November editions of the oppositional newspapers Danziger Landeszeitung and Danziger Volksstimme, which accused the Senate of violating public officials' constitutional rights. The following day Police President Froböss, citing Article II, section 5, of the Legal Ordinance concerning Measures for ensuring Public Safety and Order of June 30th, 1933, ordered them to suspend publications for 8 days and 2 months respectively. The papers' editors appealed to the League of Nations High Commissioner of Danzig, Helmer Rosting, to step in. The Volksstimme also petitioned the Senate to withdraw the ban, who rejected it. On 5 November, Froböss, citing a possible danger to the state, took the editor-in-chief of the Landeszeitung and an editor from the Volksstimme into "protective custody," predicting their papers would continue to criticize the decisions of the government. After investigating the matter himself, Commissioner Rosting forwarded the appeals to the Secretary General of the League of Nations, where they were ultimately dismissed.

In 1935, the police begin wearing caps with Totenkopf.

On 20 June 1938, an awards system for length of service in the force is established. Silver medals, silver crosses, and gold crosses are awarded for 8, 18, and 25 years of service respectively.

On 20 July 1939, a customs officer shot and killed a Polish soldier along the border. Danzig authorities maintained that the officer had fired in self-defense, while Polish officials asserted that the soldier had been in Polish territory at the time. The shooting coincided with the sentencing of a Polish public official to 14 months in prison in Danzig and the arrest of a Polish army officer in the city, further straining relations.

Treatment of Jews
In spite of the Nazi influence, the police kept relatively cordial relations with the local Jewish population. Officials often cooperated with Jewish leaders for fear that excessive oppression would result in a Polish intervention. The police also assisted the Jews in protecting the Great Synagogue from arson attacks on 12 and 13 November 1938. In 1939, the police granted a permit for the transfer of historical artifacts from the city to the Jewish Theological Seminary of America in the United States. They helped to facilitate emigration from the Free City to Poland as a peaceful and orderly means of getting rid of the Jews.

Polish-German tensions and the Invasion of Poland 

By 1939, Polish-German relations had broken down and war seemed a likely possibility. Danzig security authorities began drawing up plans to seize Polish installations throughout the city, in the event of a German offensive into the Polish Corridor. They assisted the Germans in organizing military forces within the city throughout August 1939.

On 1 September, the German pre-dreadnought SMS Schleswig-Holstein began shelling the Polish garrison at Westerplatte. Shortly thereafter Danzig police, under the command of Polezeioberst Willi Bethke, launched an attack on the city's Polish Post Office.  The coast guard unit of the police assisted the Germans at Westerplatte.

After the Invasion of Poland 
The Danzig police was taken over by the Gestapo after the invasion. Helmut Froböss left his job and became president of the provincial German high court. Stutthof, 22 miles east of the city, was run by the new President of Police as an internment camp from 1939, until it was handed over to the Germans as a political prisoner camp in November 1941.  Bombing by the Soviets in 1945 killed Obermusikmeister Ernst Stieberitz. All vestiges of the Danzig Police were eliminated when the Red Army captured the city on 28 March 1945.

See also 
SG OrPo Danzig

Citations

References

External links 
 www.danzig-online.pl/grenze/polizeie.html 
 www.danzig-online.pl Policja

History of Gdańsk
Law enforcement agencies of Poland
Defunct law enforcement agencies of the Weimar Republic
1940s disestablishments
Government agencies established in 1921